Ryan Block is a historic commercial building located at St. Joseph, Missouri. It was built in 1889, and is a three-story, trapezoidal shaped, Italianate style brick building.  It consists of three units in a row with common walls and cast iron storefronts.  It features a dentillated metal cornice and a two-story oriel window sheathed in decorative metal.

It was listed on the National Register of Historic Places in 2012.

References

Commercial buildings on the National Register of Historic Places in Missouri
Italianate architecture in Missouri
Commercial buildings completed in 1889
Buildings and structures in St. Joseph, Missouri
National Register of Historic Places in Buchanan County, Missouri